World of Glass is the third full-length album by Norwegian band Tristania. The album was released on 25 September 2001 by Napalm Records. As a result of Morten Veland leaving the band, the harsh vocals were sung by Ronny Thorsen, vocalist of Trail of Tears.

Track listing

Charts

Personnel

Tristania
 Vibeke Stene – vocals, choir
 Anders Høyvik Hidle – guitars, harsh vocals on "The Shining Path" and "Tender Trip on Earth"
 Rune Østerhus – bass
 Einar Moen – synth/programming
 Kenneth Olsson – drums

Session musicians
 Østen Bergøy – clean vocals
 Ronny Thorsen – harsh vocals
 Pete Johansen – violin
 Jan Kenneth Barkved – clean vocals on "Selling Out" and "Crushed Dreams"
 Sandrine Lachapelle, Emilie Lesbros, Johanna Giraud, Damien Surian, Hubert Piazzola – choir

References

2001 albums
Tristania (band) albums
Napalm Records albums